Laetia is a genus of plants in the family Salicaceae (formerly placed in Flacourtiaceae).

Species

 
Salicaceae genera
Taxonomy articles created by Polbot